Pouilly-en-Auxois is a commune in the Côte-d'Or department in eastern France.

It is the start of the Canal of Burgundy, which passes in a tunnel under the town.

Geography
The town was originally sited on the St Pierre hilltop surrounding a (now vanished) castle and walls built by the Dukes of Burgundy and the 13th/14th century Chapelle de Notre Dame Trouvée (Chapel of Our Lady Found).  Beginning in the 16th century the town was rebuilt further down in the valley and in 1868 the new St Pierre church was built in what is now the city center.

Climate
Pouilly-en-Auxois has a oceanic climate (Köppen climate classification Cfb).

Population

Economy
From the twelfth century, the town was a regional agricultural center, specializing in wheat and later hemp, oils, skins, wool and sheep.

Sights
The town features an unusual tower called "The Dove Cote", dating from the fifteenth century, the interior walls of which contain 1200 pigeon holes.

See also
Communes of the Côte-d'Or department

References

Communes of Côte-d'Or